Marie-Thérèse Gantenbein-Koullen (born 28 August 1938 in Tétange) is a retired Luxembourgish politician for the Christian Social People's Party.  She was a member of the Chamber of Deputies, representing the constituency of Centre from 2004 until 2009, when she retired, to be replaced by Fabienne Gaul.  In addition to sitting in the Chamber, she was a member of Hesperange's communal council for twenty-one years (1988–2009), including almost three as échevin (1997–1999), and, finally, over nine as mayor of Hesperange (1999–2009).

External links
 Chamber of Deputies official website biography

Mayors of Hesperange
Members of the Chamber of Deputies (Luxembourg)
Members of the Chamber of Deputies (Luxembourg) from Centre
Christian Social People's Party politicians
1938 births
Living people
People from Kayl
Women mayors of places in Luxembourg